Capasa is a genus of moths in the family Geometridae.

Species
Capasa abstractaria (Walker, 1862) 
Capasa festivaria (Fabricius, 1794)
Capasa flavifusata  (Moore, 1887)
Capasa hyadaria  (Guenée, 1858)
Capasa incensata (Walker, [1863])
Capasa iris (Butler, 1880)
Capasa lycoraria  (Guenée, 1858)
Capasa muscicolor Warren, 1893)
Capasa nundata (Felder, 1875)
Capasa pachiaria (Walker, 1860)
Capasa pulchraria (Rothschild,  1894)
Capasa pyrrhularia  (Guenée, 1857)
Capasa quadraria Warren, 1893)
Capasa recensata (Prout, 1925)
Capasa rufescens (Butler, 1886)
Capasa sternaria  (Guenée, 1857)
Capasa venusa (Swinhoe,  1894)

References
Gunathilagaraj Kandasamy (2016). Checklist of Indian Geometridae with FBI number.docx. - Tamil Nadu Agricultural University
 Capasa at Markku Savela's Lepidoptera and Some Other Life Forms
 Natural History Museum Lepidoptera genus database

Hypochrosini
Geometridae genera